The Vallée River (in French: rivière Vallée) is a tributary of the west bank of the Chaudière River which flows northward to empty onto the south bank of the St. Lawrence River. It flows in the municipalities of Saint-Elzéar and Siante-Marie-de-Beauce, in the La Nouvelle-Beauce Regional County Municipality, in the administrative region of Chaudière-Appalaches, in Quebec, in Canada.

Geography 

The main neighboring watersheds of the Vallée river are:
 north side: rivière des Îles Brûlées, Chaudière River;
 east side: Chaudière River, Saint-Elzéar stream;
 south side: Aulnaies stream, Savoie River;
 west side: Beaurivage River.

The Vallée river has its source in a mountainous area, in the municipality of Saint-Elzéar.

  north, in Saint-Elzéar, to a country road;
  north, up to the route du rang du Bas Saint-Jacques;
  northeasterly, up to the municipal limit of Sainte-Marie-de-Beauce;
  north-east, crossing route 171, up to its confluence.

The Vallée river empties on the west bank of the Chaudière River, in Sainte-Marie-de-Beauce.

Toponymy 
The toponym Rivière Vallée was formalized on August 8, 1977, at the Commission de toponymie du Québec.

See also 
 List of rivers of Quebec

References 

Rivers of Chaudière-Appalaches
La Nouvelle-Beauce Regional County Municipality